Wootton Rivers Lock, also called Wootton Rivers Bottom Lock, is a lock on the Kennet and Avon Canal at Wootton Rivers, Wiltshire, England.

Wootton Rivers Bottom Lock was built during the canal's construction between 1794 and 1810. The lock has a rise/fall of 8 ft 0 in (2.43 m). The parish of Wootton Rivers has three more locks upstream: Heathy Close, Brimslade, and Wootton Top Lock.

The lock and its road bridge are Grade II listed.

References

See also

Locks on the Kennet and Avon Canal

Georgian architecture in Wiltshire
Grade II listed buildings in Wiltshire
Locks on the Kennet and Avon Canal
Canals in Wiltshire
Grade II listed canals